BOTAŞ Petroleum Pipeline Corporation (BOTAS) is the state-owned crude oil and natural gas pipelines and trading company in Turkey. The company was established in 1974 as a subsidiary of TPAO. Since 1995, BOTAS is a wholly state-owned company.

History
BOTAŞ was originally established in 1974 for construction and operation of the Kirkuk-Ceyhan Oil Pipeline. Since 1987, BOTAŞ has been also involved in the natural gas transportation and trade activities. From February 9, 1990 until May 2, 2001, BOTAŞ had monopoly rights on natural gas import, distribution, sales and pricing.  In practice, the gas distribution monopoly of BOTAŞ ended only in 2007, when Royal Dutch Shell and Bosphorus Gaz, a joint venture of Gazprom and Tur Enerji, started to sell natural gas in the market.

Pipeline operations
In addition to the Kirkuk-Ceyhan Oil Pipeline, BOTAŞ owns and operates Ceyhan-Kırıkkale, Batman-Dörtyol, and Şelmo-Batman crude oil pipelines. Internationally BOTAŞ participates in the Baku-Tbilisi-Ceyhan pipeline, Arab Gas Pipeline section between Syria and Turkey, and Turkey-Greece pipeline. It is also partner in the Nabucco Pipeline project.

Finance
Energy analysts think that imports from Azerbaijan are being bought at a discounted spot price until 2024. In 2019 BOTAŞ made an operating loss of 2 million 3 hundred thousand lira for each of its 2700 employees. The company is on the Global Oil & Gas Exit List.

See also

Marmara Ereğlisi LNG Storage Facility
Northern Marmara and Değirmenköy (Silivri) Depleted Gas Reservoir
Lake Tuz Natural Gas Storage
Botaş Dörtyol LNG Storage Facility
Botaş Saros FSRU Terminal, under construction as of 2022
MT Botaş FSRU Ertuğrul Gazi

References

External links
 
 

Oil and gas companies of Turkey
Natural gas pipeline companies
Energy companies established in 1974
Ministry of Energy and Natural Resources (Turkey)
1974 establishments in Turkey